Josef Somlo (1884–1973) was a Hungarian film producer. Following the Nazi takeover in Germany, where he had worked for a number of years, Somlo went into exile in Britain. During his German period he was associated with Hermann Fellner with whom he co-produced a number of films for their Felsom Film company.

Partial filmography
 Sins of Yesterday (1922)
 Dancing Mad (1925)
 One Does Not Play with Love (1926)
 Unmarried Daughters (1926)
 The Ghost Train (1927)
 The Famous Woman (1927)
 A Modern Dubarry (1927)
 The Great Adventuress (1928)
 The Bold Dragoon (1928)
 Odette (1928)
 Number 17 (1928)
 The Woman on the Rack (1928)
 Strauss Is Playing Today (1928)
 Land Without Women (1929)
 The Fourth from the Right (1929)
 The Wrecker (1929)
 Storm in a Water Glass (1931)
 Three Days of Love (1931)
 Tell Me Tonight (1932)
 Girls to Marry (1932)
 The Arsenal Stadium Mystery (1939)
 Old Bill and Son (1941)
 Uncle Silas (1947)
 The Man Who Loved Redheads (1955)
 Behind the Mask (1958)

Bibliography
 Bergfelder, Tim & Cargnelli, Christian. Destination London: German-speaking emigrés and British cinema, 1925–1950. Berghahn Books, 2008.
 Prawer, S.S. Between Two Worlds: The Jewish Presence in German and Austrian Film, 1910-1933. Berghahn Books, 2007.

External links

1884 births
1973 deaths
Hungarian film producers
British film producers
People from Pápa
Hungarian Jews
Emigrants from Nazi Germany to the United Kingdom
Hungarian expatriates in Germany